Dead & Buried is a 1981 American horror film directed by Gary Sherman, starring Melody Anderson, Jack Albertson, and James Farentino. It is Albertson’s final live-action film role before his death six months after the film’s release. The film focuses on a small town wherein a few tourists are murdered, but their corpses begin to reanimate. With a screenplay written by Dan O'Bannon and Ronald Shusett, the film was initially banned as a "video nasty" in the U.K. in the early 1980s, but was later acquitted of obscenity charges and removed from the Director of Public Prosecutions' list.

The film made little money at the box office, but has received praise from critics regarding Stan Winston's special effects and Albertson's performance. In addition to the film being subsequently novelized by Chelsea Quinn Yarbro, the film has obtained a cult following in the years since its release.

Plot
An amateur photographer arrives in coastal Potters Bluff to practice his craft. A beautiful woman offers to model for him, but when he accepts her invitation to have sex, a mob of townspeople beat him and set him afire. The man survives the attack, but is later killed by the woman posing as a nurse in the hospital.

More visitors are murdered by the townspeople. Sheriff Dan Gillis, assisted by Dobbs, the eccentric local coroner-mortician, works hard to discover the motive for the killings. Gillis becomes increasingly disconcerted as a grisly death occurs every day. In each case, the killers photograph the victims as they are murdered. Gillis's investigations are complicated by the bizarre behavior of his wife, Janet.

Gillis accidentally hits someone with his squad car following an attack. On the grill of his car, Gillis finds the twitching severed arm of the accident victim, who attacks him and flees with the arm. After the attack, Gillis scrapes some flesh from the vehicle and takes it to the local doctor, who tells him that the tissue sample has been dead approximately four months. Gillis grows suspicious of Dobbs and conducts a background check.  He discovers that Dobbs was formerly the chief pathologist in Providence, Rhode Island, until he was dismissed ten years before for conducting unauthorized experiments in the county morgue.

Gillis confronts Dobbs, who admits he has developed a secret technique for reanimating the dead, and all of the townspeople are reanimated corpses under his control. Dobbs considers himself an "artist" who uses his reanimated to murder the living in order to create more corpses for him to create art with. Even Janet is a reanimated corpse. When she appears in Dobbs's office, Gillis shoots and mortally wounds her, then shoots Dobbs as well. He follows her into the cemetery, where she pleads with him to bury her in an open grave. After he does as she asks, the rest of the townspeople come to pay their respects.

Gillis returns to Dobbs's office to discover that Dobbs has used his technique on himself. Dobbs then shows Gillis a film of Janet stabbing him to death as the townspeople and Dobbs watch. As Gillis stares at his own decomposing hands, Dobbs offers to repair them.

Cast
 James Farentino as Sheriff Dan Gillis
 Melody Anderson as Janet Gillis
 Jack Albertson as William G. Dobbs
 Dennis Redfield as Ron
 Nancy Locke as Linda
 Lisa Blount as Lisa
 Robert Englund as Harry
 Bill Quinn as Ernie
 Michael Currie as Herman
 Christopher Allport as George LeMoyne / Freddie
 Joseph G. Medalis as The Doctor
 Macon McCalman as Ben
 Lisa Marie as Hitchhiker
 Estelle Omens as Betty
 Barry Corbin as Phil
 Michael Pataki as Sam
 Glenn Morshower as Jimmy

Production 
In a 1983 interview with Starburst promoting Blue Thunder, O'Bannon disowned the film, claiming that Shusett had actually written it by himself, but needed O'Bannon's name on the project, promising that he would implement some of O'Bannon's changes. Upon seeing the finished film, O'Bannon realised that Shusett had not included his material, but it was too late for him to take his name off the credits.

The opening shot depicting the central street scene in Potters Bluff was filmed along Lansing Street in Mendocino, California.

Critical reception 
Rotten Tomatoes reports a 68% approval rating based on 19 reviews, with a weighted average of 6.2/10.

Zombiemania: 80 Movies to Die For author Arnold T. Blumberg wrote that Dead & Buried "is another fine homage to the EC Comics style of horror, with a story that also echoes the structure of a classic Rod Serling Twilight Zone episode," adding that the film is "a late-night treat that works best with the lights off and no foreknowledge of what's to come." AllMovie wrote, "it's easy to see why Dead and Buried never found a big audience. It is too plot-heavy for those viewers in search of a shock machine yet too visceral for the viewers who appreciate subtle horror", but complimented its "blend of creepy atmosphere and gruesome shocks."  Writing in The Zombie Movie Encyclopedia, academic Peter Dendle said that the film "builds suspense effective and plays its genuine twists well, so long as you don't ask too many questions of the everyone-is-in-on-it-but-one-person plot."  Glenn Kay, who wrote Zombie Movies: The Ultimate Guide, called it a "solidly entertaining picture" and praised the special effects work by Stan Winston.
Film critic Matt Wavish writes that there is a "feeling of total dread lingering over the whole film" and concludes, "Dead and Buried is a master class in sheer terror." Gene Siskel disliked the film, and named it his dog of the week on Siskel & Ebert.

References

External links

1981 films
1981 horror films
1980s horror thriller films
1981 independent films
1980s mystery films
1980s serial killer films
1980s crime thriller films
American mystery films
American supernatural horror films
Embassy Pictures films
1980s English-language films
American zombie films
Films directed by Gary Sherman
Films scored by Joe Renzetti
Video nasties
Films produced by Ronald Shusett
Films with screenplays by Ronald Shusett
Films with screenplays by Dan O'Bannon
1980s American films